Nathalie Péchalat (born 22 December 1983) is a French retired ice dancer and skating official, who served as the president of the Fédération française des sports de glace from 2020 to 2022. 

During her competitive career with partner Fabian Bourzat, she was a two-time World bronze medalist (2012, 2014), a two-time European champion (2011–2012), and a five-time French national champion (2009, 2011–2014). They won five medals at the Grand Prix Final (2009, 2010, 2011, 2012, 2013) and thirteen other Grand Prix medals, including three golds at Cup of China and two at Trophée Eric Bompard.

Personal life 
Nathalie Péchalat was born 22 December 1983 in Rouen, France. She has an older brother and two sisters. She obtained a BSc degree in sports management and later pursued graduate studies at Emlyon Business School. While training in Moscow, she studied at the Finance University under the Government of the Russian Federation, a prestigious Russian university for economics and finance. She intends to pursue a career in business after her competitive retirement, with a preference for a company involved in sports.

Péchalat is married to French actor Jean Dujardin. Their relationship began in 2014. The couple's first daughter, Jeanne, was born on 5 December 2015. They married on 19 May 2018 in a small ceremony. Their second daughter, Alice, was born on 18 February 2021.

Early years in skating 
Nathalie Péchalat began skating at the age of seven, originally as a singles skater. At the age of ten, she switched to ice dancing after her coach, Anne Sophie Druet, suggested she was suited for the discipline and her son was looking for a partner.

Péchalat competed with Julien Deheinzelin on the ISU Junior Grand Prix series in autumn 1997 and 1998. She broke her arm in 1998 and missed six weeks of skating during her three-month recovery. She competed with Michael Zenezini in the 1999–2000 season. He ended their partnership.

Partnership with Bourzat 

In March 2000, Muriel Zazoui suggested Péchalat team up with Fabian Bourzat. The two did not get along well at first but became friends over time. In a 2011 interview, Péchalat said they had different personalities but that he was the ideal skating partner for her: "He is very gifted. He works through feeling and inspiration. As soon as he feels a move, he can reproduce it and interpret it. He does not need to intellectualize." According to Bourzat, "Nathalie is always pulling the couple ahead and pushing us to work. She brings her extraordinary capacity to work. She always wants to do everything perfectly."

Péchalat/Bourzat were coached by Muriel Boucher-Zazoui and Romain Haguenauer from 2000 to mid-2008 in Lyon, France. From 2000 to 2003, they also worked with Pasquale Camerlengo. They skated as juniors for two years, winning two Junior Grand Prix medals, before moving to seniors at the beginning of the 2002–03 season.

2003–2006 
Péchalat/Bourzat won bronze medals at the 2003 and 2005 Winter Universiade. They made their Worlds debut in 2004, finishing 20th, and their Europeans debut in 2005, placing 12th. The duo competed at the 2006 Winter Olympics, where they came in 18th.

2006–2008 
In the 2006–07 season, Péchalat/Bourzat won their first senior Grand Prix medal, a bronze at the 2006 Skate America. Péchalat lost around eight weeks of training in the winter due to a broken hand. The two missed the 2007 European Championships but were able to compete at the 2007 World Championships, where they finished in 12th place.

In the 2007–08 season, Péchalat/Bourzat won silver at both Skate America and the Cup of Russia, and qualified for their first Grand Prix Final, where they finished 6th. They were forced to miss the 2008 French National Championships after Bourzat underwent knee surgery for a torn meniscus, but returned to the ice in time for the 2008 Europeans, finishing 5th. They were 7th at the 2008 Worlds.

In July 2008, Péchalat/Bourzat moved to Moscow to train under Alexander Zhulin, with whom they had spent a few weeks in 2007, and his assistant Oleg Volkov. They said the move was difficult at first due to not knowing the Russian language and Moscow being a very expensive city to live in, however, from a skating perspective they felt it was a good move.

2009–2010 season 
For the 2009–10 season, Péchalat/Bourzat were assigned to the Trophée Eric Bompard and Skate Canada as their Grand Prix events. They finished in second place, behind Canadians Tessa Virtue / Scott Moir, in both events. These results qualified them for their second Grand Prix Final. Prior to the final, Bourzat suffered an ankle injury, but they were able to skate well enough to earn their first GPF medal, a bronze.

2010–2011 season 

Péchalat/Bourzat began the 2010–11 season with wins at the Nebelhorn Trophy and the Finlandia Trophy; the former was their first international gold medal at any level. They initially used Amélie for their short dance but replaced it with Doctor Zhivago prior to the 2010 Cup of China, which they won by a large margin. They won their second Grand Prix title at the 2010 Trophée Eric Bompard. Their results qualified them for the Grand Prix Final, where they won the silver medal. They followed this by winning French nationals for the second time in their career. Péchalat/Bourzat went on to win the 2011 Europeans, finishing first in both the short dance and the free dance, and breaking the 100-point barrier in the free dance for the first time in their career. It was their first ever medal at an ISU Championship. They produced France's fifth ice dancing European title.

In mid-February 2011, Péchalat/Bourzat performed in galas in North Korea along with other international skaters. Bourzat said, "Traveling there was not a political act at all. We came as open-minded people, who wanted to discover and exchange."

They dropped to fourth overall after Bourzat tripped and both fell during a step sequence. Following the event, reports surfaced that Péchalat / Bourzat would move to Michigan to train with Anjelika Krylova and Pasquale Camerlengo.

2011–2012 season 
In May 2011, Péchalat/Bourzat confirmed their move to the Detroit Skating Club in Bloomfield Hills, Michigan for the 2011–2012 season. They said that Camerlengo was the only coach they considered, based on their past experience of working with him during their time as juniors at Lyon, as well as wanting to continue the technique they learned under Zhulin: "[Krylova] is exactly in Zhulin's footsteps as she perpetuates the basics and technique he taught us." The French dancers remained on good terms with Zhulin and Volkov. In Michigan, they trained three hours a day on the ice and then did off-ice training. They lived close to the rink. They also spent time during the summer in Lyon to work with choreographer Kader Belmoktar on their Egypt-themed free dance.

Péchalat/Bourzat took up the new option of competing at three Grand Prix events and were assigned to 2011 Skate America, 2011 Skate Canada, and 2011 Trophee Eric Bompard. Although Bourzat was ill with bronchitis, they were able to win the silver medal at Skate America. They withdrew from Skate Canada due to Bourzat's bronchitis. Their second-place finish at the Trophee Eric Bompard, combined with their showing at Skate America, qualified them for their third straight Grand Prix Final. There, they set a new personal best score in the free dance and won the bronze medal. Their next competition was the French Championships, where they won their third national title.

At the 2012 European Championships, Péchalat/Bourzat were second after the short dance, but rallied in the free dance to win their second consecutive European title. Péchalat sustained a broken nose in training on 13 March. She said: "We just made a mistake during our twizzles, and I got knocked out." She began wearing a mask but decided to delay an operation until after the 2012 World Championships. On 25 March, Péchalat/Bourzat confirmed they would compete at the event and said surgery would not be necessary. At the World Championships, they recorded a season's best score in the short dance and a personal best score in the free dance on their way to winning the bronze, their first World medal.

2012–2013 season 

Péchalat/Bourzat won gold at both of their events, the 2012 Cup of China and 2012 Trophee Eric Bompard, and qualified for their fourth Grand Prix Final, where they won bronze. On 9 January 2013, Bourzat sustained a partial tear of the adductor muscle of his right leg, resulting in the team's withdrawal from the 2013 European Championships. Péchalat remained captain of the French team for the event. The duo decided to compete at the 2013 World Championships, motivated in part by the desire to obtain two spots for French ice dancers at the 2014 Olympics. They finished 6th at the event.

On 20 May 2013, at the French skating federation's suggestion, Péchalat/Bourzat announced a coaching change to Igor Shpilband in Novi, Michigan.

2013–2014 season 
Péchalat/Bourzat won gold at the 2013 Cup of China ahead of Bobrova/Soloviev. They were bronze medalists at the 2013 Trophée Eric Bompard behind Virtue/Moir and Ilinykh/Katsalapov. At the Grand Prix Final in Fukuoka, Japan, the French won the bronze medal, their fifth medal at the event, and then ended 2013 with their fifth national title. They withdrew from the 2014 European Championships to focus on the Olympics.

Péchalat/Bourzat placed fourth at the 2014 Winter Olympics in Sochi, Russia. Although they initially planned to retire right after the Olympics, they ultimately decided to end their competitive career at the 2014 World Championships in Saitama, Japan. 

In late 2014 she became a contestant on the fifth season of TF1's Danse avec les Stars.

Post-competitive career 
Since her and Bourzat's retirement following the 2014 World Championships, Péchalat has been very active in the skating community. She has worked as a commentator and figure skating consultant for Eurosport France since 2014, commentating at Grand Prix, Championship, and Olympic events. At the 2018 Winter Olympics, Péchalat attended as a commentator and consultant. Péchalat partnered with French Olympic Team sponsor, L'Or Espresso, to produce videos interacting with Olympic athletes.

In July 2018, Péchalat hosted a training camp for young ice dancers and figure skaters. Ice dancer, Anna Cappellini, and pairs skater, Valentina Marchei, joined her as guest coaches as well as fitness and dance coach, Silvia Notargiacomo.

FFSG president
In February 2020, scandal engulfed longtime Fédération française des sports de glace (FFSG) president Didier Gailhaguet, who was accused by retired French pair skater Sarah Abitbol of having covered up sexual abuses committed by one of Gailhaguet's longtime allies, Gilles Beyer. Sports Minister Roxana Mărăcineanu demanded Gailhaguet's resignation, which was ultimately given. Péchalat subsequently announced her candidacy to lead the FFSG, and was elected to the position on 14 March 2020 after three rivals withdrew from the race as a result of the coronavirus pandemic.

Péchalat imposed new term limits on service as the federation president, a measure generally perceived as being aimed at preventing a third Gailhaguet tenure in the office. When she sought reelection in the summer of 2022, she was unexpectedly defeated by the largely unknown Gwenaëlle Noury, who was widely seen as being controlled by Gailhaguet.

Programs 

(with Bourzat)

Competitive highlights

With Bourzat

Earlier partnerships 
(with Zenezini)

(with Deheinzelen)

References

External links 

 
 

French female ice dancers
1983 births
Living people
Emlyon Business School alumni
Sportspeople from Rouen
French expatriate sportspeople in Russia
Olympic figure skaters of France
Figure skaters at the 2006 Winter Olympics
Figure skaters at the 2010 Winter Olympics
World Figure Skating Championships medalists
European Figure Skating Championships medalists
Figure skaters at the 2014 Winter Olympics
Season's world number one figure skaters
Participants in French reality television series
Women television personalities
Universiade medalists in figure skating
Universiade bronze medalists for France
Medalists at the 2003 Winter Universiade
Competitors at the 2005 Winter Universiade